Bo Bowling (born November 1, 1987) is a former American football wide receiver, kick returner and slotback who played in the Canadian Football League (CFL) for 4 seasons with the Montreal Alouettes. He played college football at Oklahoma State, with whom he won the Alamo Bowl in December 2010.

Professional career
Bowling was signed by the Montreal Alouettes of the CFL on May 6, 2011. He announced his retirement on June 1, 2013 after tearing two ligaments in his ankle.  He retired instead of having to be released or placed on the injured list.

Bowling came out of retirement and signed with the Alouettes on October 18, 2013. He became a free agent after the 2014 season.

References

External links
Oklahoma State bio
College stats
NFL Draft Scout
Montreal Alouettes bio

Living people
1987 births
American football wide receivers
Canadian football slotbacks
Canadian football return specialists
Canadian football wide receivers
Players of Canadian football from Oklahoma
Northeastern Oklahoma A&M Golden Norsemen football players
Oklahoma State Cowboys football players
Montreal Alouettes players
Players of American football from Oklahoma
People from Tonkawa, Oklahoma